Verdict is a 1974 French-Italian drama film, directed by André Cayatte, starring Sophia Loren, Jean Gabin and Julien Bertheau. A French judge comes under intense personal pressure to acquit a man who is accused of murdering his lover. It was also released under the title Jury of One.

Plot 

The President of the Court Legun one evening, while he is at home alone with his wife Nicole, refuses to receive Mrs Teresa Léoni who would like to ask for mercy for her son André on trial for the rape and murder of Annie Chartier. Leguen, known for his severity, in fact conducts the first hearing with the usual drasticity. Then Teresa, widow of a bandit, convinced of her son's innocence, takes Mrs. Nicole hostage and blackmails her husband. The latter, having tried in vain to change the opinion of the blackmailer, changes his attitude and, despite the general amazement and the remarks of the Attorney General, influences the jurors to the point of snatching the verdict of full acquittal from them. But Nicole, in need of daily injections due to diabetes, refuses the medicines and dies. With this involuntary death on her conscience and after the confession of her freed son, Teresa throws herself with the car against a wall.

Cast
 Sophia Loren as Teresa Leoni
 Jean Gabin as Leguen, the Judge
 Julien Bertheau as Verlac, the Advocate General
 Gisèle Casadesus as Nicole Leguen
 Michel Robin as Véricel
 Henri Garcin as Maître Lannelongue
 Marthe Villalonga as The Concierge
 Daniel Lecourtois as Le procureur général

References

External links 
 

1974 films
1974 drama films
Films directed by André Cayatte
Films set in Lyon
Italian drama films
1970s French-language films
French drama films
1970s Italian films
1970s French films